Human intestinal spirochetosis, often called just intestinal spirochetosis when the human context is implicit, is an infection of the colonic-type mucosa with certain species of spirochetal bacteria. Similar infections sometimes occur in pigs, dogs, and birds; porcine intestinal spirochaetosis is an economically important disease of livestock.

Signs and symptoms
No clear association exists with complaints. However, potential associations include abdominal pain and watery diarrhea, which may be seen with blood; however, these findings are not specific and may be due to a number of other causes.

Cause
Human intestinal spirochetosis is caused by Brachyspira pilosicoli and Brachyspira aalborgi. Porcine and avian intestinal spirochetosis are caused by Brachyspira hyodysenteriae and Brachyspira pilosicoli.

Diagnosis

It is diagnosed by examination of tissue, i.e. biopsy.

Management

Symptomatic individuals can be treated with oral metronidazole.

See also
 Cryptosporidiosis

References

Gastrointestinal tract disorders